In the 2016–17 season, Espérance Sportive de Tunis competed in the Ligue 1 for the 62nd season, as well as the Tunisian Cup.  It was their 62nd consecutive season in the top flight of Tunisian football. They competed in Ligue 1, the Champions League and the Tunisian Cup.

Squad list
Players and squad numbers last updated on 18 November 2016.Note: Flags indicate national team as has been defined under FIFA eligibility rules. Players may hold more than one non-FIFA nationality.

Pre-season

Mid-season

Competitions

Overview

{| class="wikitable" style="text-align: center"
|-
!rowspan=2|Competition
!colspan=8|Record
!rowspan=2|Started round
!rowspan=2|Final position / round
!rowspan=2|First match	
!rowspan=2|Last match
|-
!
!
!
!
!
!
!
!
|-
| Ligue 1

|  
| style="background:gold;"| Winners
| 10 September 2016
| 18 May 2017
|-
| 2016 Tunisian Cup

| Quarter-finals
| style="background:gold;"|Winners
| 16 August 2016
| 27 August 2016
|-
| 2017 Tunisian Cup

| Round of 32
| Semi-finals
| 30 November 2016
| 28 May 2017
|-
| 2017 Champions League

| First round
| Quarter-finals
| 11 March 2017
| 23 September 2017
|-
! Total

Ligue 1

League table

Results summary

Results by round

Matches

Championship round

Table

Results summary

Position by round

Matches

2016 Tunisian Cup

2017 Tunisian Cup

Champions League

First round

Group stage

Group C

Squad information

Playing statistics

|-
! colspan=12 style=background:#dcdcdc; text-align:center| Goalkeepers

|-
! colspan=12 style=background:#dcdcdc; text-align:center| Defenders

|-
! colspan=12 style=background:#dcdcdc; text-align:center| Midfielders

|-
! colspan=12 style=background:#dcdcdc; text-align:center| Forwards

|-
! colspan=12 style=background:#dcdcdc; text-align:center| Players transferred out during the season

Goalscorers
Includes all competitive matches. The list is sorted alphabetically by surname when total goals are equal.

Transfers

In

Out

References 

2016-17
Tunisian football clubs 2016–17 season